The 1824–25 United States House of Representatives elections were held on various dates in various states between July 7, 1824 and August 30, 1825. Each state set its own date for its elections to the House of Representatives before the first session of the 19th United States Congress convened on December 5, 1825. Elections were held for all 213 seats, representing 24 states.

They coincided with the contentious 1824 presidential election.  After no presidential candidate won an electoral majority, in February 1825 the House of the outgoing 18th Congress chose the President, John Quincy Adams, in a contingent election.

The approach of the 1824 presidential election ended the virtually nonpartisan Era of Good Feelings and motivated major realignment.  The weak Federalist Party collapsed and the Democratic-Republican Party abruptly, catastrophically split.

Though Andrew Jackson lost the contingent election, public attitudes toward the charismatic, famous Jackson mainly determined the new alignment.  Partisans of Jackson often were called Jacksonians, by 1828 adopting the Democratic Party label.  Opponents of Jackson often were called Anti-Jacksonians, coalescing under the leadership of newly elected President John Quincy Adams and soon forming the National Republican Party.

Though both parties were new, and were not continuations of old parties, Jacksonians were more similar to the former Democratic-Republicans, while National Republicans were more similar to the former Federalists and also were political ancestors to the future Whig Party.  Leadership of the National Republicans in opposition to Jackson later would transition to Henry Clay, whose support of Adams determined the contingent election.

Election summaries
Representatives regrouped into Jackson supporters and Adams supporters (comprising the Adams-Clay faction in the contingent election), while supporters of William Crawford, whose ill health and retirement had indirectly helped trigger the realignment, divided between the two factions with 33 going to the Adams-Clay faction and 22 going to the Jackson faction.

Special elections 

There were special elections in 1824 and 1825 to the 18th United States Congress and 19th United States Congress.

Special elections are sorted by date then district.

18th Congress 

|-
! 
| William Prince
|  | Democratic-Republican
| 1822
|  | Incumbent died September 8, 1824.New member elected in 1824.Democratic-Republican hold.Successor seated December 23, 1824.Successor not elected to the next term, see below.
| nowrap | 

|-
! 
| Charles Rich
|  | Democratic-Republican
| 18121814 1816
|  | Incumbent died October 15, 1824 having already either retired or lost re-election.New member elected in 1824.Democratic-Republican hold.Successor seated December 13, 1824.Successor had not been a candidate to the next term, see below.
| nowrap | 

|-
! 
| William Lee Ball
|  | Democratic-Republican
| 1817
|  | Incumbent died February 29, 1824.New member elected in 1824.Democratic-Republican hold.Successor seated April 8, 1824.Successor later re-elected to the next term, see below.
| nowrap | 

|-
! 
| Thomas J. Rogers
|  | Democratic-Republican
| 1818 
|  | Incumbent resigned April 20, 1824.New member elected October 12, 1824.Democratic-Republican hold.Successor seated December 23, 1824.Successor also elected the same day to the next term, see below.
| nowrap | 

|-
! 
| John Tod
|  | Democratic-Republican
| 1820
|  | Incumbent resigned sometime in 1824.New member elected October 12, 1824.Democratic-Republican hold.Successor seated December 6, 1824.Successor also elected the same day to the next term, see below.
| nowrap | 

|-
! 
| colspan=3 | Vacant
|  | John Bailey (Democratic-Republican) declared not entitled to seat in previous election.Bailey was then re-elected on the third ballot November 29, 1824.Democratic-Republican gain.Successor seated December 13, 1824.Successor later elected to the next term, see below.
| nowrap | 

|-
! 
| Thomas W. Cobb
|  | Democratic-Republican
| 18161820 1822
|  | Incumbent resigned December 6, 1824 when elected U.S. Senator.New member elected in 1824.Democratic-Republican hold.Successor seated February 7, 1825.Successor had not been a candidate for the next term, see below.
| nowrap | 

|-
! 
| Hutchins G. Burton
|  | Democratic-Republican
| 1819
|  | Incumbent resigned March 23, 1824 when elected Governor of North Carolina.New member elected January 6, 1825.Democratic-Republican hold.Successor seated January 19, 1825.Successor later elected to the next term, see below.
| nowrap | 

|}

19th Congress 

|-
! 
| colspan=3 | Vacant
|  | Representative-elect James Miller declined to serve.New member elected March 8, 1825.Anti-Jacksonian gain.Successor seated December 5, 1825 with the rest of the Congress.
| nowrap | 

|-
! 
| Joel R. Poinsett
|  | Jacksonian
| 1820
|  | Incumbent resigned March 7, 1825 when appointed U.S. Minister to Mexico.New member elected May 17, 1825.Jacksonian hold.Successor seated December 5, 1825.
| nowrap | 

|-
! 
| Henry Clay
|  | Anti-Jacksonian
| 18101814 18141815 (Seat declared vacant)1815 1820 1822
|  | Incumbent resigned March 6, 1825 when appointed U.S. Secretary of State.New member elected August 1, 1825.Anti-Jacksonian hold.Successor seated December 5, 1825.
| nowrap | 

|-
! 
| James Allison Jr.
|  | Jacksonian
| 1822
|  | Incumbent resigned August 26, 1825 before the assembling of Congress.New member elected in 1825.Jacksonian hold.Successor seated December 5, 1825.
| nowrap | 

|}

Alabama 

Alabama elected its members August 1–3, 1825, after the term began but before the new Congress convened.

|-
! 
| Gabriel Moore
|  | Jackson Democratic-Republican
| 1821
|  | Incumbent re-elected as Jacksonian.
| nowrap | 

|-
! 
| John McKee
|  | Jackson Democratic-Republican
| 1823
|  | Incumbent re-elected as Jacksonian.
| nowrap | 

|-
! 
| George W. Owen
|  | Jackson Democratic-Republican
| 1823
|  | Incumbent re-elected as Jacksonian.
| nowrap | 

|}

Arkansas Territory 
See Non-voting delegates, below.

Connecticut 

Connecticut elected its members April 4, 1825, after the term began but before the new Congress convened.

|-
! rowspan=6 | 
| Gideon Tomlinson
|  | Adams-Clay Democratic-Republican
| 1818
|  | Incumbent re-elected as Anti-Jacksonian.
| nowrap rowspan=6 | 

|-
| Ansel Sterling
|  | Adams-Clay Democratic-Republican
| 1821
|  | Incumbent retired.New member elected.Anti-Jacksonian gain.

|-
| Samuel A. Foote
|  | Adams-Clay Democratic-Republican
| 1823
|  | Incumbent lost re-election.New member elected.Anti-Jacksonian gain.

|-
| Lemuel Whitman
|  | Adams-Clay Democratic-Republican
| 1823
|  | Incumbent retired.New member elected.Anti-Jacksonian gain.

|-
| Noyes Barber
|  | Adams-Clay Democratic-Republican
| 1821
|  | Incumbent re-elected as Anti-Jacksonian.

|-
| Ebenezer Stoddard
|  | Adams-Clay Democratic-Republican
| 1821
|  | Incumbent retired.New member elected.Anti-Jacksonian gain.

|}

Delaware 

Delaware elected its member October 5, 1824.

|-
! 
| Louis McLane
|  | Crawford Federalist
| 1816
|  | Incumbent re-elected as Jacksonian.
| nowrap | 

|}

Florida Territory 
See Non-voting delegates, below.

Georgia 

Georgia elected its members October 4, 1824. There were only 7 candidates who ran statewide in 1824. There were several other candidates who received votes in a small number of states, but vote totals were only available for the seven winning candidates. The minor candidates only received a few hundred votes each.

|-
! rowspan=7 | 
| Joel Abbot
|  | Crawford Democratic-Republican
| 1816
|  | Incumbent retired.New member elected.Jacksonian gain.
| nowrap rowspan=7 | 

|-
| Alfred Cuthbert
|  | Crawford Democratic-Republican
| 1820
|  | Incumbent re-elected as Jacksonian.

|-
| George Cary
|  | Crawford Democratic-Republican
| 1822
|  | Incumbent re-elected as Jacksonian.

|-
| Edward F. Tattnall
|  | Crawford Democratic-Republican
| 1820
|  | Incumbent re-elected as Jacksonian.

|-
| John Forsyth
|  | Crawford Democratic-Republican
| 1822
|  | Incumbent re-elected as Jacksonian.

|-
| Wiley Thompson
|  | Crawford Democratic-Republican
| 1820
|  | Incumbent re-elected as Jacksonian.

|-
| Thomas W. Cobb
|  | Crawford Democratic-Republican
| 1822
|  | Incumbent retired.New member elected.Jacksonian gain.

|}

Illinois 

Illinois elected its member August 2, 1824.

|-
! 
| Daniel P. Cook
|  | Adams-Clay Democratic-Republican
| 1819
|  | Incumbent re-elected as Anti-Jacksonian.
| nowrap | 

|}

Indiana 

Indiana elected its members August 2, 1824.

|-
! 
| William Prince
|  | Jackson Democratic-Republican
| 1822
|  | Incumbent retired.New member elected.Jacksonian gain.Incumbent then died September 8, 1824, leading to a special election to finish the term.
| nowrap | 

|-
! 
| Jonathan Jennings
|  | Jackson Democratic-Republican
| 1822 
|  | Incumbent re-elected as Anti-Jacksonian.
| nowrap | 

|-
! 
| John Test
|  | Jackson Democratic-Republican
| 1822
|  | Incumbent re-elected as Anti-Jacksonian.
| nowrap | 

|}

Kentucky 

Kentucky elected its members August 2, 1824.

|-
! 
| David Trimble
|  | Adams-Clay Democratic-Republican
| 1816
|  | Incumbent re-elected as Anti-Jacksonian.
| nowrap | 

|-
! 
| Thomas Metcalfe
|  | Adams-Clay Democratic-Republican
| 1818
|  | Incumbent re-elected as Anti-Jacksonian.
| nowrap | 

|-
! 
| Henry Clay
|  | Adams-Clay Democratic-Republican
| 18101814 18141815 (Seat declared vacant)1815 1820 1822
|  | Incumbent re-elected as Anti-Jacksonian.Incumbent later resigned to become U.S. Secretary of State and was replaced in a special election.
| nowrap | 

|-
! 
| Robert P. Letcher
|  | Adams-Clay Democratic-Republican
| 1822
|  | Incumbent re-elected as Anti-Jacksonian.
| nowrap | 

|-
! 
| John T. Johnson
|  | Jackson Democratic-Republican
| 1820
|  | Incumbent retired.New member elected.Jacksonian gain.
| nowrap | 

|-
! 
| David White
|  | Adams-Clay Democratic-Republican
| 1822
|  | Incumbent retired.New member elected.Jacksonian gain.
| nowrap | 

|-
! 
| Thomas P. Moore
|  | Jackson Democratic-Republican
| 1822
|  | Incumbent re-elected as Jacksonian.
| nowrap | 

|-
! 
| Richard A. Buckner
|  | Adams-Clay Democratic-Republican
| 1822
|  | Incumbent re-elected as Anti-Jacksonian.
| nowrap | 

|-
! 
| Charles A. Wickliffe
|  | Jackson Democratic-Republican
| 1822
|  | Incumbent re-elected as Jacksonian.
| nowrap | 

|-
! 
| Francis Johnson
|  | Adams-Clay Democratic-Republican
| 1820 
|  | Incumbent re-elected as Anti-Jacksonian.
| nowrap | 

|-
! 
| Philip Thompson
|  | Adams-Clay Democratic-Republican
| 1822
|  | Incumbent lost re-election.New member elected.Anti-Jacksonian gain.
| nowrap | 

|-
! 
| Robert P. Henry
|  | Jackson Democratic-Republican
| 1822
|  | Incumbent re-elected as Jacksonian.
| nowrap | 

|}

Louisiana 

Louisiana elected its members July 7–9, 1824.

|-
! 
| Edward Livingston
|  | Jackson Democratic-Republican
| 1822
|  | Incumbent re-elected as Jacksonian.
| nowrap | 

|-
! 
| Henry H. Gurley
|  | Adams-Clay Democratic-Republican
| 1822
|  | Incumbent re-elected as Anti-Jacksonian.
| nowrap | 

|-
! 
| William L. Brent
|  | Adams-Clay Democratic-Republican
| 1822
|  | Incumbent re-elected as Anti-Jacksonian.
| nowrap | 

|}

Maine 

Maine elected its members September 13, 1824. Maine law required a majority vote for election, n Maine law required a majority vote for electionecessitating additional ballots in the 3rd and 4th districts on January 3, 1825, April 4, 1825, and September 12, 1825.

|-
! 
| William Burleigh
|  | Adams-Clay Democratic-Republican
| 1823
|  | Incumbent re-elected as Anti-Jacksonian.
| nowrap | 

|-
! 
| Stephen Longfellow
|  | Adams-Clay Federalist
| 1823
|  | Incumbent lost re-election.New member elected.Jacksonian gain.
| nowrap | 

|-
! 
| Ebenezer Herrick
|  | Adams-Clay Democratic-Republican
| 1821
|  | Incumbent re-elected as Anti-Jacksonian.
| nowrap |     

|-
! 
| Joshua Cushman
|  | Adams-Clay Democratic-Republican
| 1818
|  | Incumbent lost re-election.New member elected.Anti-Jacksonian gain.
| nowrap |    

|-
! 
| Enoch Lincoln
|  | Adams-Clay Democratic-Republican
| 1818 
|  | Incumbent re-elected as Anti-Jacksonian.
| nowrap | 

|-
! 
| Jeremiah O'Brien
|  | Adams-Clay Democratic-Republican
| 1823
|  | Incumbent re-elected as Anti-Jacksonian.
| nowrap | 

|-
! 
| David Kidder
|  | Adams-Clay Democratic-Republican
| 1823
|  | Incumbent re-elected as Anti-Jacksonian.
| nowrap | 

|}

Maryland 

Maryland elected its members October 4, 1824.

|-
! 
| Raphael Neale
|  | Adams-Clay Federalist
| 1818
|  | Incumbent lost re-election.New member elected.Anti-Jacksonian gain.
| nowrap | 

|-
! 
| Joseph Kent
|  | Adams-Clay Democratic-Republican
| 18101814 1818
|  | Incumbent re-elected as Anti-Jacksonian.
| nowrap | 

|-
! 
| Henry R. Warfield
|  | Adams-Clay Federalist
| 1820
|  | Incumbent retired.New member elected.Jacksonian gain.
| nowrap | 

|-
! 
| John Lee
|  | Jackson Federalist
| 1822
|  | Incumbent lost re-election.New member elected.Anti-Jacksonian gain.
| nowrap | 

|-
! rowspan=2 | 
| Isaac McKim
|  | Jackson Democratic-Republican
| 1823 
|  | Incumbent lost re-election.New member elected.Anti-Jacksonian gain.
| nowrap rowspan=2 | 

|-
| Peter Little
|  | Jackson Democratic-Republican
| 18101812 1816
|  | Incumbent re-elected as Anti-Jacksonian.

|-
! 
| George E. Mitchell
|  | Adams-Clay Democratic-Republican
| 1822
|  | Incumbent re-elected as Jacksonian.
| nowrap | 

|-
! 
| William Hayward Jr.
|  | Crawford Democratic-Republican
| 1822
|  | Incumbent retired.New member elected.Anti-Jacksonian gain.
| nowrap | 

|-
! 
| John S. Spence
|  | Adams-Clay Democratic-Republican
| 1822
|  | Incumbent lost re-election.New member elected.Anti-Jacksonian gain.
| nowrap | 

|}

Massachusetts 

Massachusetts elected its members November 1, 1824. Massachusetts had a majority requirement for election, which necessitated additional elections held January 3, 1825, April 1, 1825, and August 1, 1825.

District numbers vary between sources.

|-
! 
| Daniel Webster
|  | Adams-Clay Federalist
| 18121816 1822
|  | Incumbent re-elected as Anti-Jacksonian.
| nowrap | 

|-
! 
| Benjamin W. Crowninshield
|  | Adams-Clay Democratic-Republican
| 1823
|  | Incumbent re-elected as Anti-Jacksonian.
| nowrap | 

|-
! 
| Jeremiah Nelson
|  | Adams-Clay Federalist
| 18041806 1814
|  | Incumbent retired.New member elected.Anti-Jacksonian gain.
|   

|-
! 
| Timothy Fuller
|  | Adams-Clay Democratic-Republican
| 1816
|  | Incumbent retired.New member elected.Anti-Jacksonian gain.
| nowrap | 

|-
! 
| Jonas Sibley
|  | Adams-Clay Democratic-Republican
| 1823
|  | Incumbent lost re-election.New member elected.Anti-Jacksonian gain.
|     

|-
! 
| John Locke
|  | Adams-Clay Democratic-Republican
| 1823
|  | Incumbent re-elected as Anti-Jacksonian.
| nowrap | 

|-
! 
| Samuel C. Allen
|  | Adams-Clay Democratic-Republican
| 1816
|  | Incumbent re-elected as Anti-Jacksonian.
|   

|-
! 
| Samuel Lathrop
|  | Adams-Clay Democratic-Republican
| 1819
|  | Incumbent re-elected as Anti-Jacksonian.
|    

|-
! 
| Henry W. Dwight
|  | Adams-Clay Democratic-Republican
| 1820
|  | Incumbent re-elected as Anti-Jacksonian.
| nowrap | 

|-
! 
| John Bailey
|  | Adams-Clay Democratic-Republican
| 1823 
|  | Incumbent re-elected as Anti-Jacksonian.
|   

|-
! 
| Aaron Hobart
|  | Adams-Clay Democratic-Republican
| 1820
|  | Incumbent re-elected as Anti-Jacksonian.
| nowrap | 

|-
! 
| Francis Baylies
|  | Adams-Clay Democratic-Republican
| 1820
|  | Incumbent re-elected as Jacksonian.
|   

|-
! 
| John Reed Jr.
|  | Adams-Clay Democratic-Republican
| 18121816 1820
|  | Incumbent re-elected as Anti-Jacksonian.
| nowrap | 

|}

Michigan Territory 
See Non-voting delegates, below.

Mississippi 

Mississippi elected its member August 2–3, 1824.

|-
! 
| Christopher Rankin
|  | Jackson Democratic-Republican
| 1819
|  | Incumbent re-elected as Jacksonian.
| nowrap | 

|}

Missouri 

Missouri elected its member August 2, 1824.

|-
! 
| John Scott
|  | Adams-Clay Democratic-Republican
| 1820
|  | Incumbent re-elected as Anti-Jacksonian.
| nowrap | 

|}

New Hampshire 

New Hampshire elected its members between November 1, 1824 and March 8, 1825. New Hampshire law required candidates to receive votes from a majority of voters for election. As only five candidates received votes from a majority of voters, a run-off election had to be held for the sixth seat on March 8, 1825.

|-
! rowspan=6 | 
| Ichabod Bartlett
|  | Adams-Clay Democratic-Republican
| 1822
|  | Incumbent re-elected as Anti-Jacksonian.
| nowrap rowspan=6 | 

|-
| Arthur Livermore
|  | Adams-Clay Democratic-Republican
| 18161820 1822
|  | Incumbent lost re-election.New member elected.Jacksonian gain.

|-
| Matthew Harvey
|  | Adams-Clay Democratic-Republican
| 1820
|  | Incumbent retired.New member elected.Anti-Jacksonian gain.Successor (James Miller) declined to serve, leading to a March 8, 1825 special election.

|-
| Aaron Matson
|  | Adams-Clay Democratic-Republican
| 1820
|  | Incumbent retired.New member elected.Anti-Jacksonian gain.

|-
| Thomas Whipple Jr.
|  | Adams-Clay Democratic-Republican
| 1820
|  | Incumbent re-elected as Anti-Jacksonian.

|-
| William Plumer Jr.
|  | Adams-Clay Democratic-Republican
| 1818
|  | Incumbent retired.New member elected.Anti-Jacksonian gain.

|}

New Jersey 

New Jersey elected its members November 2, 1824.

|-
! rowspan=6 | 
| Lewis Condict
|  | Jackson Democratic-Republican
| 1820
|  | Incumbent re-elected as Anti-Jacksonian.
| nowrap rowspan=6 | 

|-
| George Holcombe
|  | Jackson Democratic-Republican
| 1820
|  | Incumbent re-elected as Jacksonian.

|-
| George Cassedy
|  | Jackson Democratic-Republican
| 1820
|  | Incumbent re-elected as Jacksonian.

|-
| Daniel Garrison
|  | Jackson Democratic-Republican
| 1822
|  | Incumbent re-elected as Jacksonian.

|-
| Samuel Swan
|  | Jackson Democratic-Republican
| 1820
|  | Incumbent re-elected as Anti-Jacksonian.

|-
| James Matlack
|  | Adams-Clay Democratic-Republican
| 1820
|  | Incumbent retired.New member elected.Anti-Jacksonian gain.

|}

New York 

New York elected its members November 1–3, 1824.

|-
! 
| Silas Wood
|  | Adams-Clay Democratic-Republican
| 1818
|  | Incumbent re-elected as Anti-Jacksonian.
| nowrap | 

|-
! 
| Jacob Tyson
|  | Crawford Democratic-Republican
| 1822
|  | Incumbent retired.New member elected.Anti-Jacksonian gain.
| nowrap | 

|-
! rowspan=3 | 
| Churchill C. Cambreleng
|  | Crawford Democratic-Republican
| 1821
|  | Incumbent re-elected as Jacksonian.
| nowrap rowspan=3 | 

|-
| Peter Sharpe
|  | Adams-Clay Democratic-Republican
| 1822
|  | Incumbent lost re-election.New member elected.Jacksonian gain.

|-
| John J. Morgan
|  | Jackson Democratic-Republican
| 1821
|  | Incumbent retired.New member elected.Jacksonian gain.

|-
! 
| Joel Frost
|  | Crawford Democratic-Republican
| 1822
|  | Incumbent retired.New member elected.Anti-Jacksonian gain.
| nowrap | 

|-
! 
| William W. Van Wyck
|  | Adams-Clay Democratic-Republican
| 1821
|  | Incumbent retired.New member elected.Anti-Jacksonian gain.
| nowrap | 

|-
! 
| Hector Craig
|  | Jackson Democratic-Republican
| 1822
|  | Incumbent lost re-election.New member elected.Jacksonian gain.
| nowrap | 

|-
! 
| Lemuel Jenkins
|  | Crawford Democratic-Republican
| 1822
|  | Incumbent retired.New member elected.Anti-Jacksonian gain.
| nowrap | 

|-
! 
| James Strong
|  | Adams-Clay Federalist
| 18181821 1822
|  | Incumbent re-elected as Anti-Jacksonian.
| nowrap | 

|-
! 
| James L. Hogeboom
|  | Crawford Democratic-Republican
| 1822
|  | Incumbent retired.New member elected.Anti-Jacksonian gain.
| nowrap | 

|-
! 
| Stephen Van Rensselaer
|  | Adams-Clay Federalist
| 1822 
|  | Incumbent re-elected as Anti-Jacksonian.
| nowrap | 

|-
! 
| Charles A. Foote
|  | Crawford Democratic-Republican
| 1822
|  | Incumbent retired.New member elected.Jacksonian gain.
| nowrap | 

|-
! 
| Lewis Eaton
|  | Crawford Democratic-Republican
| 1822
|  | Incumbent retired.New member elected.Jacksonian gain.
| nowrap | 

|-
! 
| Isaac Williams Jr.
|  | Adams-Clay Democratic-Republican
| 18121814 18161818 1822
|  | Incumbent retired.New member elected.Anti-Jacksonian gain.
| nowrap | 

|-
! 
| Henry R. Storrs
|  | Adams-Clay Federalist
| 18161821 1822
|  | Incumbent re-elected as Anti-Jacksonian.
| nowrap | 

|-
! 
| John Herkimer
|  | Adams-Clay Democratic-Republican
| 18161818 1822
|  | Incumbent lost re-election.New member elected.Jacksonian gain.
| nowrap | 

|-
! 
| John W. Cady
|  | Adams-Clay Democratic-Republican
| 1822
|  | Incumbent retired.New member elected.Anti-Jacksonian gain.
| nowrap | 

|-
! 
| John W. Taylor
|  | Adams-Clay Democratic-Republican
| 1812
|  | Incumbent re-elected as Anti-Jacksonian.
| nowrap | 

|-
! 
| Henry C. Martindale
|  | Adams-Clay Federalist
| 1822
|  | Incumbent re-elected as Anti-Jacksonian.
| nowrap | 

|-
! 
| John Richards
|  | Crawford Democratic-Republican
| 1822
|  | Incumbent retired.New member elected.Anti-Jacksonian gain.
| nowrap | 

|-
! rowspan=2 | 
| Ela Collins
|  | Crawford Democratic-Republican
| 1822
|  | Incumbent retired.New member elected.Anti-Jacksonian gain.
| nowrap rowspan=2 | 

|-
| Egbert Ten Eyck
|  | Crawford Democratic-Republican
| 1822
|  | Incumbent re-elected as Jacksonian.Election later successfully contested.

|-
! 
| Lot Clark
|  | Crawford Democratic-Republican
| 1822
|  | Incumbent lost re-election.New member elected.Anti-Jacksonian gain.
| nowrap | 

|-
! 
| Justin Dwinell
|  | Crawford Democratic-Republican
| 1822
|  | Incumbent retired.New member elected.Anti-Jacksonian gain.
| nowrap | 

|-
! 
| Elisha Litchfield
|  | Crawford Democratic-Republican
| 1821
|  | Incumbent lost re-election.New member elected.Anti-Jacksonian gain.
| nowrap | 

|-
! 
| Rowland Day
|  | Crawford Democratic-Republican
| 1822
|  | Incumbent lost re-election.New member elected.Jacksonian gain.
| nowrap | 

|-
! 
| Samuel Lawrence
|  | Adams-Clay Democratic-Republican
| 1822
|  | Incumbent retired.New member elected.Anti-Jacksonian gain.
| nowrap | 

|-
! rowspan=2 | 
| Dudley Marvin
|  | Adams-Clay Democratic-Republican
| 1822
|  | Incumbent re-elected as Anti-Jacksonian.
| nowrap rowspan=2 | 

|-
| Robert S. Rose
|  | Adams-Clay Democratic-Republican
| 1822
|  | Incumbent re-elected as Anti-Jacksonian.

|-
! 
| Moses Hayden
|  | Adams-Clay Democratic-Republican
| 1822
|  | Incumbent re-elected as Anti-Jacksonian.
| nowrap | 

|-
! 
| William Woods
|  | Adams-Clay Democratic-Republican
| 1823 
|  | Incumbent lost re-election.New member elected.Anti-Jacksonian gain.
| nowrap | 

|-
! 
| Parmenio Adams
|  | Adams-Clay Democratic-Republican
| 1822
|  | Incumbent re-elected as Anti-Jacksonian.
| nowrap | 

|-
! 
| Albert H. Tracy
|  | Adams-Clay Democratic-Republican
| 1818
|  | Incumbent retired.New member elected.Anti-Jacksonian gain.
| nowrap | 

|}

North Carolina 

North Carolina elected its members August 11, 1825 after the term began but before the new Congress convened.

|-
! 
| Alfred M. Gatlin
|  | Crawford Democratic-Republican
| 1823
|  | Incumbent lost re-election.New member elected.Jacksonian gain.
| nowrap | 

|-
! 
| George Outlaw
|  | Crawford Democratic-Republican
| 1825 
|  | Incumbent lost re-election.New member elected.Jacksonian gain.
| nowrap | 

|-
! 
| Thomas H. Hall
|  | Crawford Democratic-Republican
| 1817
|  | Incumbent lost re-election.New member elected.Jacksonian gain.
| nowrap | 

|-
! 
| Richard D. Spaight Jr.
|  | Crawford Democratic-Republican
| 1823
|  | Incumbent lost re-election.New member elected.Anti-Jacksonian gain.
| nowrap | 

|-
! 
| Charles Hooks
|  | Crawford Democratic-Republican
| 1816 1817 1819
|  | Incumbent lost re-election.New member elected.Jacksonian gain.
| nowrap | 

|-
! 
| Weldon N. Edwards
|  | Crawford Democratic-Republican
| 1816 
|  | Incumbent re-elected as Jacksonian.
| nowrap | 

|-
! 
| John Culpepper
|  | Adams-Clay Federalist
| 18061808 (Contested election)1808 18131816 18191821 1823
|  | Incumbent lost re-election.New member elected.Jacksonian gain.
| nowrap | 

|-
! 
| Willie P. Mangum
|  | Crawford Democratic-Republican
| 1823
|  | Incumbent re-elected as Jacksonian.
| nowrap | 

|-
! 
| Romulus M. Saunders
|  | Crawford Democratic-Republican
| 1821
|  | Incumbent re-elected as Jacksonian.
| nowrap | 

|-
! 
| John Long
|  | Crawford Democratic-Republican
| 1821
|  | Incumbent re-elected as Anti-Jacksonian.
| nowrap | 

|-
! 
| Henry W. Connor
|  | Jackson Democratic-Republican
| 1821
|  | Incumbent re-elected as Jacksonian.
| nowrap | 

|-
! 
| Robert B. Vance
|  | Crawford Democratic-Republican
| 1823
|  | Incumbent lost re-election.New member elected.Jacksonian gain.
| nowrap | 

|-
! 
| Lewis Williams
|  | Crawford Democratic-Republican
| 1815
|  | Incumbent re-elected as Anti-Jacksonian.
| nowrap | 

|}

Ohio 

Ohio elected its members October 12, 1824.

|-
! 
| James W. Gazlay
|  | Jackson Democratic-Republican
| 1822
|  | Incumbent lost re-election.New member elected.Jacksonian gain.
| nowrap | 

|-
! 
| Thomas R. Ross
|  | Crawford Democratic-Republican
| 1818
|  | Incumbent lost re-election.New member elected.Anti-Jacksonian gain.
| nowrap | 

|-
! 
| William McLean
|  | Adams-Clay Democratic-Republican
| 1822
|  | Incumbent re-elected as Anti-Jacksonian.
| nowrap | 

|-
! 
| Joseph Vance
|  | Adams-Clay Democratic-Republican
| 1820
|  | Incumbent re-elected as Anti-Jacksonian.
| nowrap | 

|-
! 
| John W. Campbell
|  | Jackson Democratic-Republican
| 1816
|  | Incumbent re-elected as Anti-Jacksonian.
| nowrap | 

|-
! 
| Duncan McArthur
|  | Adams-Clay Democratic-Republican
| 18121813 1822
|  | Incumbent lost re-election.New member elected.Jacksonian gain.
| nowrap | 

|-
! 
| Samuel F. Vinton
|  | Adams-Clay Democratic-Republican
| 1822
|  | Incumbent re-elected as Anti-Jacksonian.
| nowrap | 

|-
! 
| William Wilson
|  | Crawford Democratic-Republican
| 1822
|  | Incumbent re-elected as Anti-Jacksonian.
| nowrap | 

|-
! 
| Philemon Beecher
|  | Adams-Clay Democratic-Republican
| 18161820 1822
|  | Incumbent re-elected as Anti-Jacksonian.
| nowrap | 

|-
! 
| John Patterson
|  | Adams-Clay Democratic-Republican
| 1822
|  | Incumbent lost re-election.New member elected.Anti-Jacksonian gain.
| nowrap | 

|-
! 
| John C. Wright
|  | Adams-Clay Democratic-Republican
| 1822
|  | Incumbent re-elected as Anti-Jacksonian.
| nowrap | 

|-
! 
| John Sloane
|  | Adams-Clay Democratic-Republican
| 1818
|  | Incumbent re-elected as Anti-Jacksonian.
| nowrap | 

|-
! 
| Elisha Whittlesey
|  | Adams-Clay Democratic-Republican
| 1822
|  | Incumbent re-elected as Anti-Jacksonian.
| nowrap | 

|-
! 
| Mordecai Bartley
|  | Adams-Clay Democratic-Republican
| 1822
|  | Incumbent re-elected as Anti-Jacksonian.
| nowrap | 

|}

Pennsylvania 

Pennsylvania elected its members October 12, 1824.

|-
! 
| Samuel Breck
|  | Adams-Clay Federalist
| 1822
|  | Incumbent retired.New member elected.Jacksonian gain.
| nowrap | 

|-
! 
| Joseph Hemphill
|  | Jackson Federalist
| 18001802 1818
|  | Incumbent re-elected as Jacksonian.
| nowrap | 

|-
! 
| Daniel H. Miller
|  | Jackson Democratic-Republican
| 1822
|  | Incumbent re-elected as Jacksonian.
| nowrap | 

|-
! rowspan=3 | 
| James Buchanan
|  | Jackson Federalist
| 1820
|  | Incumbent re-elected as Jacksonian.
| nowrap rowspan=3 | 

|-
| Samuel Edwards
|  | Jackson Federalist
| 1818
|  | Incumbent re-elected as Jacksonian.

|-
| Isaac Wayne
|  | Jackson Federalist
| 1822
|  | Incumbent retired.New member elected.Anti-Jacksonian gain.

|-
! 
| Philip S. Markley
|  | Jackson Democratic-Republican
| 1822
|  | Incumbent re-elected as Anti-Jacksonian.
| nowrap | 

|-
! 
| Robert Harris
|  | Jackson Democratic-Republican
| 1822
|  | Incumbent re-elected as Jacksonian.
| nowrap | 

|-
! rowspan=2 | 
| Daniel Udree
|  | Jackson Democratic-Republican
| 1813 (special)1822 (special)
|  | Incumbent retired.New member elected.Jacksonian gain.
| nowrap rowspan=2 | 

|-
| Henry Wilson
|  | Jackson Democratic-Republican
| 1822
|  | Incumbent re-elected as Jacksonian.

|-
! rowspan=2 | 
| Samuel D. Ingham
|  | Jackson Democratic-Republican
| 18121818 1822 
|  | Incumbent re-elected as Jacksonian.
| nowrap rowspan=2 | 

|-
| Thomas Jones Rogers
|  | Jackson Democratic-Republican
| 1818 
|  | Incumbent resigned April 20, 1824.New member elected.Jacksonian gain.Successor also elected the same day to the next term.

|-
! rowspan=3 | 
| Samuel McKean
|  | Jackson Democratic-Republican
| 1822
|  | Incumbent re-elected as Jacksonian.
| nowrap rowspan=3 | 

|-
| George Kremer
|  | Jackson Democratic-Republican
| 1822
|  | Incumbent re-elected as Jacksonian.

|-
| William Cox Ellis
|  | Jackson Federalist
| 18201821 1822
|  | Incumbent lost re-election.New member elected.Jacksonian gain.

|-
! 
| James S. Mitchell
|  | Jackson Democratic-Republican
| 1820
|  | Incumbent re-elected as Jacksonian.
| nowrap | 

|-
! rowspan=2 | 
| James Wilson
|  | Jackson Democratic-Republican
| 1822
|  | Incumbent re-elected as Anti-Jacksonian.
| nowrap rowspan=2 | 

|-
| John Findlay
|  | Jackson Democratic-Republican
| 1821 
|  | Incumbent re-elected as Jacksonian.

|-
! 
| John Brown
|  | Jackson Democratic-Republican
| 1820
|  | Incumbent lost re-election.New member elected.Jacksonian gain.
| nowrap | 

|-
! 
| John Tod
|  | Jackson Democratic-Republican
| 1820
|  | Incumbent resigned sometime in 1824.New member elected.Jacksonian gain.Successor also elected the same day to the next term.
| nowrap | 

|-
! 
| Andrew Stewart
|  | Jackson Democratic-Republican
| 1820
|  | Incumbent re-elected as Jacksonian.
| nowrap | 

|-
! 
| Thomas Patterson
|  | Jackson Democratic-Republican
| 1816
|  | Incumbent retired.New member elected.Anti-Jacksonian gain.
| nowrap | 

|-
! rowspan=2 | 
| James Allison Jr.
|  | Jackson Democratic-Republican
| 1822
|  | Incumbent re-elected as Jacksonian.
| nowrap rowspan=2 | 

|-
| Walter Forward
|  | Jackson Democratic-Republican
| 1822 
|  | Incumbent lost re-election.New member elected.Jacksonian gain.

|-
! 
| George Plumer
|  | Jackson Democratic-Republican
| 1820
|  | Incumbent re-elected as Jacksonian.
| nowrap | 

|-
! 
| Patrick Farrelly
|  | Jackson Democratic-Republican
| 1820
|  | Incumbent re-elected as Jacksonian.
| nowrap | 

|}

Rhode Island 

Rhode Island elected its members August 30, 1825 after the term began but before the new Congress convened. Rhode Island law required a candidate receive votes from a majority of voters for election, as only one candidate received a majority in this election, a  Rhode Island law required a candidate receive votes from a majority of voters for election, as only one candidate received a majority in this electionsecond election was held for the remaining seat.

|-
! rowspan=2 | 
| Samuel Eddy
|  | Adams-Clay Democratic-Republican
| 1818
|  | Incumbent lost re-election.New member elected.Anti-Jacksonian gain.
| nowrap rowspan=2 | 

|-
| Job Durfee
|  | Adams-Clay Democratic-Republican
| 1820
|  | Incumbent lost re-election.New member elected.Anti-Jacksonian gain.

|}

South Carolina 

South Carolina elected its members October 11–12, 1824.

District numbers vary between sources.

|-
! 
| Joel R. Poinsett
|  | Jackson Democratic-Republican
| 1820
|  | Incumbent re-elected as Jacksonian.
| nowrap | 

|-
! 
| James Hamilton Jr.
|  | Jackson Democratic-Republican
| 1822 
|  | Incumbent re-elected as Jacksonian.
| nowrap | 

|-
! 
| Robert B. Campbell
|  | Jackson Democratic-Republican
| 1823
|  | Incumbent retired.New member elected.Jacksonian gain.
| nowrap | 

|-
! 
| Andrew R. Govan
|  | Jackson Democratic-Republican
| 1822 
|  | Incumbent re-elected as Jacksonian.
| nowrap | 

|-
! 
| George McDuffie
|  | Jackson Democratic-Republican
| 1820
|  | Incumbent re-elected as Jacksonian.
| nowrap | 

|-
! 
| John Wilson
|  | Jackson Democratic-Republican
| 1820
|  | Incumbent re-elected as Jacksonian.
| nowrap | 

|-
! 
| Joseph Gist
|  | Jackson Democratic-Republican
| 1820
|  | Incumbent re-elected as Jacksonian.
| nowrap | 

|-
! 
| John Carter
|  | Jackson Democratic-Republican
| 1822 
|  | Incumbent re-elected as Jacksonian.
| nowrap | 

|-
! 
| Starling Tucker
|  | Jackson Democratic-Republican
| 1816
|  | Incumbent re-elected as Jacksonian.
| nowrap | 

|}

Tennessee 

Tennessee elected its members August 4–5, 1825, after the term began but before the new Congress convened.

|-
! 
| John Blair
|  | Jackson Democratic-Republican
| 1823
|  | Incumbent re-elected as Jacksonian.
| nowrap | 

|-
! 
| John Cocke
|  | Jackson Democratic-Republican
| 1819
|  | Incumbent re-elected as Jacksonian.
| nowrap | 

|-
! 
| James I. Standifer
|  | Jackson Democratic-Republican
| 1823
|  | Incumbent lost re-election.New member elected.Jacksonian gain.
| nowrap | 

|-
! 
| Jacob C. Isacks
|  | Jackson Democratic-Republican
| 1823
|  | Incumbent re-elected as Jacksonian.
| nowrap | 

|-
! 
| Robert Allen
|  | Jackson Democratic-Republican
| 1819
|  | Incumbent re-elected as Jacksonian.
| nowrap | 

|-
! 
| James T. Sandford
|  | Jackson Democratic-Republican
| 1823
|  | Incumbent lost re-election.New member elected.Jacksonian gain.
| nowrap | 

|-
! 
| Sam Houston
|  | Jackson Democratic-Republican
| 1823
|  | Incumbent re-elected as Jacksonian.
| nowrap | 

|-
! 
| James B. Reynolds
|  | Jackson Democratic-Republican
| 18151817 1823
|  | Incumbent lost re-election.New member elected.Jacksonian gain.
| nowrap | 

|-
! 
| Adam R. Alexander
|  | Jackson Democratic-Republican
| 1823
|  | Incumbent re-elected as Jacksonian.
| nowrap | 

|}

Vermont 

Vermont elected its members September 7, 1824.  Congressional districts were re-established in Vermont for the 1824 election. Vermont had used an  1812-1818 and 1822. A majority was required for election, which was not met in the 1st district, necessitating a second election December 6, 1824.

|-
! 
| William C. Bradley
|  | Adams-Clay Democratic-Republican
| 18121814 1822
|  | Incumbent re-elected as Anti-Jacksonian.
| First ballot (September 7, 1824):Second ballot (December 6, 1824): 

|-
! rowspan=2 | 
| Rollin C. Mallary
|  | Adams-Clay Democratic-Republican
| 1818
|  | Incumbent re-elected as Anti-Jacksonian.
| rowspan=2 nowrap | 

|-
| Charles Rich
|  | Adams-Clay Democratic-Republican
| 18121814 1816
|  | Unknown if incumbent retired or lost re-election.Democratic-Republican loss.Incumbent then died October 15, 1824, leading to a special election.

|-
! 
| colspan=3 | None (District created)
|  | New seat.New member elected.Anti-Jacksonian gain.
| nowrap | 

|-
! 
| Samuel C. Crafts
|  | Adams-Clay Democratic-Republican
| 1816
|  | Incumbent lost re-election.New member elected.Jacksonian gain.
| nowrap | 

|-
! 
| Daniel A. A. Buck
|  | Adams-Clay Democratic-Republican
| 1822
|  | Incumbent lost re-election.New member elected.Anti-Jacksonian gain.
| nowrap | 

|}

Virginia 

Virginia elected its members in April 1825, after the term began but before the new Congress convened.

|-
! 
| Thomas Newton Jr.
|  | Adams-Clay Democratic-Republican
| 1801
|  | Incumbent re-elected as Anti-Jacksonian.
| nowrap | 

|-
! 
| Arthur Smith
|  | Crawford Democratic-Republican
| 1821
|  | Incumbent retired.New member elected.Jacksonian gain.
| nowrap | 

|-
! 
| William S. Archer
|  | Crawford Democratic-Republican
| 1820 
|  | Incumbent re-elected as Jacksonian.
| nowrap | 

|-
! 
| Mark Alexander
|  | Crawford Democratic-Republican
| 1819
|  | Incumbent re-elected as Jacksonian.
| nowrap | 

|-
! 
| John Randolph
|  | Crawford Democratic-Republican
| 17991813 18151817 1819
|  | Incumbent re-elected as Jacksonian.
| nowrap | 

|-
! 
| George Tucker
|  | Crawford Democratic-Republican
| 1819
|  | Incumbent retired.New member elected.Jacksonian gain.
| nowrap | 

|-
! 
| Jabez Leftwich
|  | Crawford Democratic-Republican
| 1821
|  | Incumbent lost re-election.New member elected.Jacksonian gain.
| nowrap | 

|-
! 
| Burwell Bassett
|  | Crawford Democratic-Republican
| 18051812 18151819 1821
|  | Incumbent re-elected as Jacksonian.
| nowrap | 

|-
! 
| Andrew Stevenson
|  | Crawford Democratic-Republican
| 1821
|  | Incumbent re-elected as Jacksonian.
| nowrap | 

|-
! 
| William C. Rives
|  | Crawford Democratic-Republican
| 1823
|  | Incumbent re-elected as Jacksonian.
| nowrap | 

|-
! 
| Philip P. Barbour
|  | Crawford Democratic-Republican
| 1814 
|  | Incumbent retired.New member elected.Anti-Jacksonian gain.
| nowrap | 

|-
! 
| Robert S. Garnett
|  | Crawford Democratic-Republican
| 1817
|  | Incumbent re-elected as Jacksonian.
| nowrap | 

|-
! 
| John Taliaferro
|  | Crawford Democratic-Republican
| 1824 
|  | Incumbent re-elected as Anti-Jacksonian.
| nowrap | 

|-
! 
| Charles F. Mercer
|  | Crawford Democratic-Republican
| 1817
|  | Incumbent re-elected as Anti-Jacksonian.
| nowrap | 

|-
! 
| John S. Barbour
|  | Crawford Democratic-Republican
| 1823
|  | Incumbent re-elected as Jacksonian.
| nowrap | 

|-
! 
| James Stephenson
|  | Federalist
| 1821
|  | Incumbent retired.New member elected.Anti-Jacksonian gain.
| nowrap | 

|-
! 
| Jared Williams
|  | Crawford Democratic-Republican
| 1819
|  | Incumbent retired.New member elected.Anti-Jacksonian gain.
| nowrap | 

|-
! 
| Joseph Johnson
|  | Jackson Democratic-Republican
| 1823
|  | Incumbent re-elected as Jacksonian.
| nowrap | 

|-
! 
| William McCoy
|  | Crawford Democratic-Republican
| 1811
|  | Incumbent re-elected as Jacksonian.
| nowrap | 

|-
! 
| John Floyd
|  | Crawford Democratic-Republican
| 1817
|  | Incumbent re-elected as Jacksonian.
| nowrap | 

|-
! 
| William Smith
|  | Crawford Democratic-Republican
| 1821
|  | Incumbent re-elected as Jacksonian.
| nowrap | 

|-
! 
| Alexander Smyth
|  | Crawford Democratic-Republican
| 1817
|  | Incumbent retired.New member elected.Anti-Jacksonian gain.
| nowrap | 

|}

Non-voting delegates 

|-
! 
| Henry Conway
|  | Democratic-Republican
| 1822
| Incumbent re-elected.
| nowrap | 

|-
! 
| Richard Keith Call
|  | Unknown
| 1822
| Incumbent retired.New member elected.
| nowrap | 

|-
! 
| Gabriel Richard
|  | Unknown
| 1823
| Incumbent lost re-election.New member elected.
| nowrap | 

|}

See also
 1824 United States elections
 List of United States House of Representatives elections (1824–1854)
 1824 United States presidential election
 1824–25 United States Senate elections
 18th United States Congress
 19th United States Congress

Notes

References

Bibliography

External links
 Office of the Historian (Office of Art & Archives, Office of the Clerk, U.S. House of Representatives)